The following is a list of countries with whom India has extradition treaties :

List of countries with whom India has extradition arrangements

References

https://cbi.gov.in/extradition-treatie
http://www.mea.gov.in/extradition-treaties-and-arrangements.htm

United States treaties
Treaties of India